Šaľa District is a district in the Nitra Region of western Slovakia. 
Until 1918, the district formed mostly part of the county of Kingdom of Hungary of Nyitra, apart from a small area in the west around Diakovce, Tešedíkovo and Žihárec which formed part of the county of Pressburg.

Municipalities 
Diakovce
Dlhá nad Váhom
Hájske
Horná Kráľová
Kráľová nad Váhom
Močenok
Neded
Šaľa
Selice
Tešedíkovo
Trnovec nad Váhom
Vlčany
Žihárec

Districts of Slovakia
Geography of Nitra Region